The 1975–76 Chicago Black Hawks season was the Hawks' 50th season in the NHL. During the previous season, the club had a 37–35–8 record, earning 82 points, and finished in third place in the Smythe Division. Then, the Black Hawks upset the heavily favored Boston Bruins in the NHL preliminary series before losing to the Buffalo Sabres in the NHL quarter-finals.

Pit Martin and Stan Mikita were named co-captains for the season. The team had played without a captain, since 1969–70.

Chicago started off the 1975–76 regular season with a 10–4–11 record in their first 25 games and took the lead in the Smythe Division.  The Hawks had a 15-game unbeaten streak (6–0–9) during that span.  The team reached a peak of being ten games over .500 with a record of 21–11–16 through 48 games.  Chicago then fell into a slump and found themselves under .500 with only four games left in the season, falling to 29–30–17. The club went unbeaten in their last four games (3–0–1) to finish the year with a 32–30–18 record, earning 82 points, which was enough to finish in first place in the Smythe Division.  The Hawks 32 wins was their lowest toal since 1967–68, when they also won 32 games.

Offensively, the Black Hawks were led by Pit Martin, who had a club high 32 goals and 71 points. Dennis Hull rebounded from a poor 1974–75 season to score 27 goals and 66 points.  Ivan Boldirev scored 28 goals and 62 points. Defenseman Dale Tallon led the club with 47 assists, while scoring 15 goals for 62 points.  Stan Mikita missed 32 games due to injuries; however, he still earned 57 points. Keith Magnuson had a team high +13 rating, and Phil Russell led the club with 194 penalty minutes.

In goal, Tony Esposito once again led the club with 30 victories and a 2.97 GAA, earning four shutouts in 68 games.

Since the Hawks won their division, they were given a bye in the NHL preliminary series, and they faced the powerful Montreal Canadiens in the NHL quarter-finals.  The Canadiens had a record breaking season in 1975–76 with 58 wins and 127 points and finished in first place in the Norris Division. The Black Hawks—Canadiens series opened with two games at the Montreal Forum. The Canadiens quickly took control of the series, shutting out Chicago 4–0 in the series opener, and then winning 3–1 in the second game. The series continued at Chicago Stadium for the next two games, where the Canadiens took the third game by a 2–1 score, and then swept the Hawks out of the playoffs with a 4–1 victory in the fourth game.

Season standings

Game log

Regular season

Playoffs: Montreal Canadiens 4, Chicago Black Hawks 0

Season stats

Scoring leaders

Goaltending

Playoff stats

Scoring leaders

Goaltending

Draft picks
Chicago's draft picks during the 1975 NHL Amateur Draft at the NHL Office in Montreal, Quebec.

Awards, records and honors
Stan Mikita, Lester Patrick Trophy

References

Sources
Hockey-Reference
Rauzulu's Street
Goalies Archive
HockeyDB
National Hockey League Guide & Record Book 2007

Chicago Blackhawks seasons
Chicago Blackhawks
Chicago Blackhawks
Smythe Division champion seasons